The following lists events that happened during 1977 in the Grand Duchy of Luxembourg.

Incumbents

Events

January – March
 18 January – Lucien Kraus is appointed to the Council of State.

April – June
 3 April – Luxembourg adopts Central European Summer Time regularly for the first time.
 7 May – Representing Luxembourg, Anne-Marie Besse finishes sixteenth in the Eurovision Song Contest 1977 with the song Frère Jacques.
 3 June – The Sidor waste-to-energy incinerator at Leudelange is inaugurated.
 12 June – The Netherlands' Bert Pronk wins the 1977 Tour de Luxembourg.
 22 June – The government abandons plan to build a nuclear power plant at Remerschen, due to fears that the country wouldn't have enough police to protect the site from protestors.

July – September
 29 July – Cornel Meder is appointed to the Council of State.
 2 August – A law creating the Société nationale de Crédit et d'Investissement is passed.
 16 September – Marcel Mart leaves the government to join the European Court of Auditors, and is replaced by Josy Barthel.

October – December

Unknown
 At the conference of the International Telecommunication Union, in Geneva, Luxembourg is assigned five frequencies for satellite broadcasting, furthering the government's move towards making Luxembourg a leader in satellite telecommunications.
 Jeunesse Esch wins the 1976-77 National Division title.

Births
 20 August – Stéphane Gillet, footballer
 5 November – Christian Poos, cyclist
 25 November - Max Jacoby, filmmaker

Deaths
 26 July – Prince Charles of Luxembourg (1927–1977)

Footnotes

References